The Middle Fork Feather River is a major river in Plumas and Butte Counties in the U.S. state of California.

Its headwaters are located near Beckwourth in the largest alpine basin in the Sierra Nevada, the Sierra Valley. The convergence of several streams there creates the Sierra Valley Channels, the largest of which is Little Last Chance Creek, flowing out of Frenchman Lake across the northeast side of the valley. Flowing west, it is joined by Big Grizzly Creek, with waters from Lake Davis. The river continues west, passing Portola and turning northwest at Clio, where it is joined by Sulphur Creek. In the area of Graeagle, It is joined by Frazier Creek, flowing out of Gold Lake, then Gray Eagle Creek, flowing out of Long Lake. After flowing through the Mohawk Valley, it then turns westwards into a canyon. Jamison Creek and Nelson Creek enter from the left, then Onion Valley Creek a few miles onward. Bear Creek, Willow Creek and the North Fork Middle Fork Feather River all come in from the right as the river courses west-southwest through a tight, steep canyon strewn with rapids. It is then joined by the South Branch Middle Fork Feather River from the left. As the river widens into an arm of Lake Oroville, a reservoir formed by the Oroville Dam, the Fall River joins from the left. The reservoir is fed by the North, Middle, West and South Forks of the Feather River, which once joined in the valley to form the main Feather River. That river continues southwards to join the Sacramento River near the unincorporated community of Plumas Landing.

One of the Middle Fork Feather's tributaries, the Fall River, feeds the  Feather Falls. This waterfall is often claimed to be the third or sixth tallest in the United States; but in reality is nowhere near the top ten in height.

Wild and Scenic River
The Middle Fork is recognized by the US Government for its untamed beauty and is designated a National Wild and Scenic River for 77.6 miles of its length. The 32.9 mile stretch inaccessible to roads is home to some of the best wild trout fishing in California.

Grizzly Valley
The Grizzly Valley is a  landform of the upper Middle Fork Feather watershed that receives 29-37 inches of annual precipitation.  The valley is the location of Lake Davis, an impoundment of Big Grizzly Creek by the 1967 Grizzly Valley Dam.

References

Tributaries of the Feather River
Rivers of Plumas County, California
Rivers of the Sierra Nevada (United States)
Feather Headwaters
Plumas National Forest
Rivers of Northern California
Rivers of the Sierra Nevada in California